Country Funk 1969–1975 is a compilation album released on July 24, 2012 by Light in the Attic Records. The compilation represents selections from an obscure offshoot of country and funk music, deemed "country funk".

Background

The compilation represents selections from an obscure offshoot of country and funk music, deemed "country funk". Jessica Hundley of The New York Times describes country funk as "an inherently defiant genre […] a style that encompasses the elation of gospel with the sexual thrust of the blues, country hoedown harmony with inner city grit. It is both studio slick and barroom raw." Country funk has been described as geographically diverse: "There was no central label or venue around which its practitioners congregated [...] Instead, these tracks are points on a map, representing nearly every corner of America and seemingly endless musical possibilities." Its peak period has been described as a "curious, glorious moment in musical history when dirty, long-haired country-rockers reclaimed hillbilly music from the slicksters who dominated mainstream country, refashioning the music in their own defiant image."

The compilation was produced by Zach Cowie, Matt Sullivan and Patrick McCarthy; the tracks were remastered by John Baldwin at John Baldwin Mastering.

Reception

Country Funk 1969–1975 received very positive reviews from contemporary music publications. Pitchfork Media gave the compilation an 8.4 out 10, with Stephen M. Deusner writing that "More than any genre or style, that sense of effusive engagement with such a wide range of materials and perspectives binds these artists together, no matter how disparate their background or their music." Thom Jurek of Allmusic described the music represented as an illumination of "a brief but fruitful period where genre lines blurred, and both genres benefitted mightily." PopMatters' Matthew Fiander called the compilation "an awfully impressive feat […] Rather than dig into a genre we already know, or mine a famous part of musical history for new ideas—or worse, old ideas repackaged—this disc proposes a new idea, that some unified thing was happening, even if the people involved weren’t totally aware of it, even if we hadn't given it a name, until now." Nathan Rabin of The A.V. Club wrote that Country Funk "unforgettably chronicles a moment and a movement long overdue for a revival while highlighting the furtively multi-cultural, freewheeling, and loose roots of a quintessentially American art form."

Track listing

Personnel
Information adapted from liner notes.
Production
 Zach Cowie – producer, images and archival material
 Matt Sullivan – producer, executive producer
 Patrick McCarthy – producer, project coordinator, images and archival material
 Josh Wright – executive producer
 Jessica Hundley – liner notes
 Jess Rotter – illustration
 Henry Owings – design
 Chunklet Graphic Control – design
 John Baldwin – remastering
 Dick Monda – images and archival material
 Eothen Alapatt – images and archival material
 Featherbeard – images and archival material

References

External links
 
 

2012 compilation albums
Country music compilation albums
Light in the Attic Records compilation albums